Macrobathra trimorpha is a moth in the family Cosmopterigidae. It was described by Edward Meyrick in 1889. It is found in Australia, where it has been recorded from Western Australia.

References

Macrobathra
Moths described in 1889